"We Own The Night" is a song by producers and disc jockeys Tiësto and Wolfgang Gartner with vocals from British singer Luciana, which was featured on the second volume of Tiesto's Club Life compilation series, Club Life, Vol. 2 - Miami. "We Own The Night" peaked at No. 1 on the UK Club Charts.

Music video
The video premiered on Tiësto's YouTube channel on 8 May 2012, and features cameo footage of numerous DJs playing sets, including Steve Angello, Afrojack and Skrillex, as well as Verwest and Youngman themselves. It begins with the message "Dedicated to all the DJs around the world... we own the night", and then begins with shots of Verwest and Youngman playing sets with crowd shots before the song drops and other DJs feature. Notably Luciana does not appear in the video.

Track listing
iTunes single (MF039)
"We Own The Night" (Radio Edit) - 3:38

Beatport single (MF039)
"We Own The Night" (Original Mix) - 5:31

Other usage
Rapper Iggy Azalea used melodies from "We Own the Night" in her track titled "Bac 2 Tha Future (My Time)".

Charts

Release history

References 

2012 singles
Tiësto songs
2012 songs
Songs written by Luciana Caporaso
Songs written by Tiësto
Songs written by Nick Clow
Wolfgang Gartner songs